Qani (1898-1965) was the pen name of Muhammad Kabuli, a prominent Kurdish poet.
He was born in the village of Rîshen, around Mariwan, in Iranian Kurdistan. He lost his parents shortly after his birth. 

Because he devoted most of his poetry to oppressed people, he is known as the Kurdish Poet of the Oppressed. The main themes of his poetry are freedom, Kurdish struggle, women's rights, nature and love.

Works
Gulaley Merîwan
Baxcey Kurdistan
Ciwarbaxî Pêncwên
Shaxî Hewraman
Deshtî Germiyan

References 

Kurdish poets
20th-century Kurdish people
1898 births
1965 deaths
Iranian Kurdish people
20th-century poets